Jan van Grinsven (born 27 February 1960 in Den Dungen, North Brabant) is a Dutch former football goalkeeper, who played for FC Den Bosch (1981–1992 and 1995–1999) and MVV Maastricht (1992–1995) and scored one goal in his career. He retired in 1999, having played 484 games in Dutch professional football, and soon afterwards became an assistant coach who worked for FC Den Bosch.

References

  Profile

1960 births
Living people
Dutch footballers
Dutch football managers
Association football goalkeepers
Eredivisie players
Eerste Divisie players
MVV Maastricht players
FC Den Bosch players
People from Sint-Michielsgestel
Footballers from North Brabant